Korea's National Treasure No. 285, the Bangudae Petroglyphs, are located mainly on flat vertical rock faces around 8m wide and around 5m high on steep cliffs on the riverside of the Daegokcheon stream, a branch of the Taehwa River, which runs eastward and joins the Donghae at Ulsan. The surrounding ten rock faces have a small number of engravings as well. The rocks consist of shale and hornfels oriented toward the north and they shine for a while at sunset. As an overhanging cliff they are in the structure of a rock shelter.

Description
Three hundred and four representations can be seen, of which 166 figures are animals and 108 are unidentified motifs. Representations of cetaceans are the most frequent, being 14.4% of the figures. In terms of theme, the representations are either anthropomorphic, depicting the body or face of a human; zoomorphic, showing sea and land animals; hunting and fishing tools; and indeterminate markings whose themes or shapes are hard to identify.

The engravings of whales and deer were made in most cases by carving out the body, while those of land animals mostly consist of outlines and patterns drawn on the rock surface. Such difference suggest difference in the time of production, given the overlapping relationships of the depictions. At the site, cetaceans are most important, followed by deer and land animals in that order, and there are a small number of turtles, seals, fish, and birds.

Human figures
The figures are side views of the whole body with a somewhat exaggerated penis or front images of people with mask-like faces spreading their four limbs. There are engravings of people hunting animals with a bow, raising their hands, and playing a long rod like a musical instrument, recalling hunting and religious acts.

Animal figures
Shapes and features enable the species to be discriminated. Most of them are whales and concentrated on the left main rock face. Ungulate mammals like deer and predatory animals like tigers, leopard, and wolves are mainly on the right main rock face. Animals whose species can be identified include large cetaceans such as the northern right whale, the humpback whale, the right whale, the gray whale, and the sperm whale. There are also sea animals such as sea turtles, seal, salmon-like fish; sea birds; and land animals such as red deer, musk deer, roe deer, water deer, tigers, leopards, wolves, foxes, raccoon dogs, and wild boars.

Sea animals
Whale engravings are in general 20 to 30 cm long and between 10 and 80 cm high. Most show whales swimming in a group upward as if seen from a bird's-eye view. Sideway engravings of whales are made in a "twisted method" in which the tail is carved sideways to show the horizontal tail of the whale, which is different from fish. Other rock art shows a mother whale with her baby on her back, whale jumping scenes, and large cetaceans migrating to and from the remote sea, all vividly depicting whale behaviour. The whale horizontally overturning a boat with its body seems to be dead, and stripes carved on its body are thought to be distribution or breakup lines, resembling ethnographic material describing natives distributing pieces of whale. These engravings are assessed to provide important information about the hunting and subsequent distribution of large animals.

The three turtles on the upper left of the main rock face appear to be guiding whales swimming in a group. Since sea turtles come to the shore to spawn between early spring and summer, they are often regarded in ancient myth as symbolic animals crossing the boundary of sea and land. In the case of fish, heads of fish looking like sharks are depicted sideways, and there are salmon jumping above the sea surface. On later engravings there is the suggestion of a wooden fence, but since the inner outlines resemble fish and land animals are lacking the possibility of a fishpound has been considered.

Land animals
Most of the land animals are shown in a side view, which can best express the shape of four-limbed land animals. Some species can be classified according to the shape of body, skin patterns, the length of tail and legs, and the shoulder line. These include sika deer, red deer, musk deer, roe deer, and water deer.

Sea birds are always placed around whales as they are hunting prey. Some engravings show mating and molt scenes of land animals and because of different patterns and angle of fall suggest the annual change of seasons and the breeding season.

Tools
Tools  relating to hunting and fishing such as boats, floats, harpoons, fishing net, fish pounds, and bows provide information on the age of the rock art and livelihood of the time. This site also has scenes of whales and tigers being captured with a net. Although no prehistoric net has yet been excavated, fine marks of net on pottery discovered in the Dongsam-dong Shell Midden suggest that nets were widely used not only for fishing but also for hunting in those days.

The site has scenes showing whaling activities in great detail. Around 5–17 people are on boats surrounding whales. The bows and sterns are semi-circular and are connected to a harpoon stuck into the body of whales and to floats hanging on a rope. The tools are almost identical to those used by natives for whaling today.

Indeterminate figures
Engravings of uncertain theme and content have been classified into two types: those of unknown theme which are in good condition and those of unknown shape which have been worn and damaged over time and are therefore hard to decode. Some have signs with certain patterns, but it is hard to classify them on the basis of engravings on the rock alone. Signs are conceptual expressions that are impossible to find in real life but are repeated expressions of a certain pattern.

Dating
According to the results of an analysis of animal bones discovered in a shell midden in Ulsan and widespread along the southeastern coasts and of research on Ulsan Bay's archaeological environment, the site dates from 6,000 to 1,000 BC. Many relics related to the themes of the rock art were found at Neolithic sites, include deer pattern pottery, net pattern pottery and shell mask discovered in the Dongsam-dong Shell Midden in Busan, a figure with human faces in Osan-ri in Yangyang, a small clay wild pig excavated from the shell midden on Yokjido island of Tongyeong, the clay figure of a woman in Sinam-ri in Ulsan, and a small clay seal excavated from the shell midden in Sejuk-ri, Ulsan. Furthermore, a boat was excavated from the shell midden in Bibong-ri, Changnyeong, and during the Hwangseong-dong site excavation research project conducted by the Korea Archaeology and Art History Research Institute a whale bone stuck with a harpoon was found, which empirically proves whaling.

The layers which contain the bones of captured whales date back to 5500 to 4700 BP. Consequently, considering livelihoods in that period, hunting and fishing tools, related relics, and contemporary contents, the rock art seems to have been made between the early and mid-Neolithic era. Before the site was discovered, the first whaling was thought to have taken place between the 10th and 11th century.

From the abundant representations of marine animals, the site seems to be in close relationship with hunter-fishers attributed to the Neolithic era (between 8000 BP and 3500 BP). Consequently, the Bangudae site has the most ancient evidence of whaling worldwide and is considered highly important not only as a first whaling representation, but also for understanding prehistoric maritime culture in the northern Pacific area.

Preservation concerns 
The Sayeon Dam, built from 1962 to 1965 and expanded between 1999 and 2002, helps supply Ulsan with drinking water but has caused the rocks on which the petroglyphs are carved to be flooded for about eight months of every year. This periodic flooding raises concerns of erosion and water damage of the rock-art motifs, which are considered to be masterpieces of prehistoric art and an invaluable source of prehistoric information. The government of Korea is considering building a polycarbonate “dam” to protect the rock faces.

See also 
 Prehistoric Korea
 Jeulmun pottery period
 Mumun pottery period
 List of South Korean tourist attractions
 National Treasure (South Korea)

References

 
 Kim, Won-yong. Art and Archaeology of Ancient Korea. Taekwang, Seoul, 1986.
 Nelson, Sarah M. The Archaeology of Korea. Cambridge University Press, Cambridge, 1993, pp. 154.
 Jang Seog-Ho,  Iconological Research of the Petroglyph of Daegok-Ri, National Treasure No. 285, 2007, http://digital.kyobobook.co.kr/kyobobook/articleDetail.laf?category=006&barcode=4010021593917
 Korean Rock Art III, Ulsan Petroglyph Museum, 2013

External links 
 
  Facebook page

Petroglyphs
Archaeological sites in South Korea
Early Korean history
National Treasures of South Korea
Tourist attractions in Ulsan
World Heritage Tentative List